Messalina or The Affairs of Messalina is a 1951 historical drama film directed by Carmine Gallone and starring María Félix, Georges Marchal and Memo Benassi. It was a co-production between France, Italy and Spain. It was shot at the Cinecittà studios in Rome with sets designed by Gastone Medin and Vittorio Nino Novarese. It was part of a growing trend of epic historical films of 1950s.

The film portrays the story of the Messalina, the third wife of the Roman Emperor Claudius.

Main cast
 María Félix as Messalina  
 Georges Marchal as Caio Silio / Gaius Silius  
 Memo Benassi as Claudio / Claudius  
 Delia Scala as Cinzia  
 Erno Crisa as Timo / Timus  
 Carlo Ninchi as Tauro / Taurus  
 Camillo Pilotto as Ottavio / Octave 
 Jean Tissier as Mnester  
 Jean Chevrier as Valerio / Valerius Asiaticus 
 Germaine Kerjean as Ismene  
 Ave Ninchi as Locusta / Locuste  
 Michel Vitold as Narciso / Narcissus
 Giuseppe Varni as Pallante
 Luigi Almirante as the jeweler  
 Lamberto Picasso as the astrologer 
 Gino Saltamerenda as the brothel's manager
 Cesare Barbetti as Lucio / Lucius  
 Achille Majeroni as Appolonio / Appolonius 
 Giovanna Galletti as the Christian woman

References

Bibliography 
 Winkler, Martin N. Cinema and Classical Texts: Apollo's New Light. Cambridge University Press, 2009.

External links 
 

1951 films
1950s historical films
1950s biographical films
Italian biographical films
French biographical films
Peplum films
1950s French-language films
1950s Italian-language films
Films directed by Carmine Gallone
Films set in ancient Rome
Films set in the Roman Empire
Films set in the 1st century
Biographical films about Roman emperors
Cultural depictions of Claudius
Cultural depictions of Messalina
Films produced by Cesáreo González
Films shot at Cinecittà Studios
Sword and sandal films
Films scored by Renzo Rossellini
Italian black-and-white films
Spanish black-and-white films
French black-and-white films
1950s Italian films
1950s French films